{{DISPLAYTITLE:C13H12O8}}
The molecular formula C13H12O8 (molar mass: 296.23 g/mol, exact mass: 296.0532 u) may refer to:

 Caffeoylmalic acid
 Coutaric acid

Molecular formulas